KRKK is a commercial AM radio station broadcasting from Rock Springs, Wyoming on 1360 kHz. KRKK broadcasts from two towers near its studios on Yellowstone Road in Rock Springs, Wyoming and is owned by Big Thicket Broadcasting Company of Wyoming.  The current programming format is oldies under the branding Unforgettable Memories.

History
Prior to 1974, KRKK was known as KVRS and was operating on 1400 kHz. That station signed on in 1942, but was licensed in 1938.

On April 1, 1942, it became an affiliate of the Mutual Broadcasting System.

The station became KRKK at 5:30 AM on September 1, 1974. During its beginnings, the station carried top 40 programming, but switched to oldies some time in the 1980s. The station aired an oldies format from Cumulus Media.

The switch to talk occurred the first week of the May 2009 and the station became a conservative talk station.

On December 14, 2014, the station changed formats to ESPN Radio, becoming 1360 ESPN.

After three years of sports talk, the station returned to an oldies format, rebranding as Unforgettable Memories.

Signal
At 5,000 watts during the day, KRKK drops to 1,000 watts at night with a directional signal to protect other stations on 1360 kHz. Reception of the station begins to fade near the Sweetwater County line to the east and west, however under the right conditions KRKK can be heard much farther distances. KRKK has three sister stations KSIT 99.7, KQSW 96.5 and KMRZ-FM 106.7 FM.

In 2018, the station added a translator on 103.5 FM. The translator was broadcasting from Aspen Mountain.

Former logos

References

External links

Radio stations established in 1938
RKK
Oldies radio stations in the United States
Sweetwater County, Wyoming